Takuvaine FC is a Cook Islands football club located in Rarotonga, Cook Islands. It currently plays in Cook Islands Round Cup the main football league competition. They have yet to win a championship but have won two Cook Islands Cups.

Current squad

Titles
Cook Islands Cup: 2
1991, 2014

References

Football clubs in the Cook Islands